Michael David Fisher (born 12 December 1950 in Acton) is a fictional character in the BBC sitcom Only Fools and Horses. He was publican of the Nag's Head, the fictional Peckham pub that frequently serves as a setting in the show. Mike was portrayed by Kenneth MacDonald, and appeared in the show from 1983 to 1996.

Mike first appeared in Only Fools and Horses in the episode, Who's a Pretty Boy?, in which Del ingratiated himself with the new landlord by agreeing to a deal which would see Mike accept Del's £2,000 offer to re-decorate the pub, leaving them with £500 apiece and using the remaining £1,000 to pay Brendan O'Shaughnessy. With many scenes in subsequent episodes set in the Nag's Head, Mike became a regular character.

Friendly but dull-witted, Mike was often on the receiving end of Del's shenanigans or attempts to sell his low-quality goods. He rarely managed to get to Del to pay off his bar tab or even to pay for his drinks as he ordered them. Among the goods he bought from Del were a hairdryer that was actually a paint stripper (leaving Mike with severe burns to the head), a malfunctioning deep fryer and a faulty fax machine. On the other hand, he was quite happy to con people out of their money when he could, evidenced by one occasion where he sold Denzil a plate of beef stew for £1, then sold exactly the same thing to a yuppie for £2.50, calling it "Boeuf Bourguignon."

When Kenneth MacDonald died in 2001, writer John Sullivan added a storyline to new episode "If They Could See Us Now", which explained that Mike had been caught up in Del and Rodney's shady financial dealings and attempted to embezzle the brewery in order to cover his losses, for which he was imprisoned. Café owner Sid took over Mike's position of landlord.

In the 2015 book He Who Dares, a fictional Del Boy autobiography, it is said that Mike's prison sentence had been reduced and he had retired to the Isle of Wight to write a memoir of his time inside. Del had left him a number of messages, but had never received any responses.

References

Only Fools and Horses characters
Fictional bartenders
Fictional English people
Television characters introduced in 1983
Male characters in television